Buckminsterfullerene is a type of fullerene with the formula C60. It has a cage-like fused-ring structure (truncated icosahedron) made of twenty hexagons and twelve pentagons, and resembles a football. Each of its 60 carbon atoms is bonded to its three neighbors. 

Buckminsterfullerene is a black solid that dissolves in hydrocarbon solvents to produce a violet solution.  The compound was discovered in 1985 and has received intense study, although few real world applications have been found.

Occurrence
Buckminsterfullerene is the most common naturally occurring fullerene.  Small quantities of it can be found in soot. 

It also exists in space. Neutral C60 has been observed in planetary nebulae and several types of star. The ionised form, C60+, has been identified in the interstellar medium, where it is the cause of several absorption features known as diffuse interstellar bands in the near-infrared.

History

Theoretical predictions of buckminsterfullerene molecules appeared in the late 1960s and early 1970s. It was first generated in 1984 by Eric Rohlfing, Donald Cox, and Andrew Kaldor using a laser to vaporize carbon in a supersonic helium beam, although the group did not realize that buckminsterfullerene had been produced. In 1985 their work was repeated by Harold Kroto, James R. Heath, Sean C. O'Brien, Robert Curl, and Richard Smalley at Rice University, who recognized the structure of C60 as buckminsterfullerene.

Concurrent but unconnected to the Kroto-Smalley work, astrophysicists were working with spectroscopists to study infrared emissions from giant red carbon stars. Smalley and team were able to use a laser vaporization technique to create carbon clusters which could potentially emit infrared at the same wavelength as had been emitted by the red carbon star. Hence, the inspiration came to Smalley and team to use the laser technique on graphite to generate fullerenes.

Using laser evaporation of graphite the Smalley team found Cn clusters (where  and even) of which the most common were C60 and C70. A solid rotating graphite disk was used as the surface from which carbon was vaporized using a laser beam creating hot plasma that was then passed through a stream of high-density helium gas. The carbon species  were subsequently cooled and ionized resulting in the formation of clusters. Clusters ranged in molecular masses, but Kroto and Smalley found predominance in a C60 cluster that could be enhanced further by allowing the plasma to react longer. They also discovered that C60 is a cage-like molecule, a regular truncated icosahedron.

Kroto, Curl, and Smalley were awarded the 1996 Nobel Prize in Chemistry for their roles in the discovery of buckminsterfullerene and the related class of molecules, the fullerenes.

The experimental evidence, a strong peak at 720 atomic mass units, indicated that a carbon molecule with 60 carbon atoms was forming, but provided no structural information. The research group concluded after reactivity experiments, that the most likely structure was a spheroidal molecule. The idea was quickly rationalized as the basis of an icosahedral symmetry closed cage structure. Kroto mentioned geodesic dome structures of the noted futurist and inventor Buckminster Fuller as influences in the naming of this particular substance as buckminsterfullerene.

In 1989 physicists Wolfgang Krätschmer, Konstantinos Fostiropoulos, and Donald R. Huffman observed unusual optical absorptions in thin films of carbon dust (soot). The soot had been generated by an arc-process between two graphite electrodes in a helium atmosphere where the electrode material evaporates and condenses forming soot in the quenching atmosphere. Among other features, the IR spectra of the soot showed four discrete bands in close agreement to those proposed for C60.

Another paper on the characterization and verification of the molecular structure followed on in the same year (1990) from their thin film experiments, and detailed also the extraction of an evaporable as well as benzene-soluble material from the arc-generated soot. This extract had TEM and X-ray crystal analysis consistent with arrays of spherical C60 molecules, approximately 1.0 nm in van der Waals diameter as well as the expected molecular mass of 720 Da for C60 (and 840 Da for C70) in their mass spectra. The method was simple and efficient to prepare the material in gram amounts per day (1990) which has boosted the fullerene research and is even today applied for the commercial production of fullerenes.

The discovery of practical routes to C60 led to the exploration of a new field of chemistry involving the study of fullerenes.

Etymology
The discoverers of the allotrope named the newfound molecule after Buckminster Fuller, who designed many geodesic dome structures that look similar to C60 and who had died in 1983, the year before discovery. This is slightly misleading, however, as Fuller's geodesic domes are constructed only by further dividing hexagons or pentagons into triangles, which are then deformed by moving vertices radially outward to fit the surface of a sphere. Geometrically speaking, buckminsterfullerene is a naturally-occurring example of a Goldberg polyhedron. A common, shortened name for buckminsterfullerene is buckyballs.

Synthesis
Soot is produced by laser ablation of graphite or pyrolysis of aromatic hydrocarbons. Fullerenes are extracted from the soot with organic solvents using a Soxhlet extractor. This step yields a solution containing up to 75% of C60, as well as other fullerenes. These fractions are separated using chromatography. Generally, the fullerenes are dissolved in a hydrocarbon or halogenated hydrocarbon and separated using alumina columns.

Structure
Buckminsterfullerene is a truncated icosahedron with 60 vertices, 32 faces (20 hexagons and 12 pentagons where no pentagons share a vertex), and 90 edges (30 edges between 5-membered & 6-membered rings and 60 edges are shared between 6-membered & 6-membered rings), with a carbon atom at the vertices of each polygon and a bond along each polygon edge. The van der Waals diameter of a  molecule is about 1.01 nanometers (nm). The nucleus to nucleus diameter of a  molecule is about 0.71 nm. The  molecule has two bond lengths. The 6:6 ring bonds (between two hexagons) can be considered "double bonds" and are shorter than the 6:5 bonds (between a hexagon and a pentagon). Its average bond length is 0.14 nm. Each carbon atom in the structure is bonded covalently with 3 others.

Properties

For a time buckminsterfullerene was the largest known molecule observed to exhibit wave–particle duality; theoretically every object exhibits this behavior. In 2020 the dye molecule phthalocyanine exhibited the duality that is more famously attributed to light, electrons and other small particles and molecules.

Solution

Fullerenes are sparingly soluble in aromatic solvents and carbon disulfide, but insoluble in water. Solutions of pure C60 have a deep purple color which leaves a brown residue upon evaporation. The reason for this color change is the relatively narrow energy width of the band of molecular levels responsible for green light absorption by individual C60 molecules. Thus individual molecules transmit some blue and red light resulting in a purple color. Upon drying, intermolecular interaction results in the overlap and broadening of the energy bands, thereby eliminating the blue light transmittance and causing the purple to brown color change.

 crystallises with some solvents in the lattice ("solvates"). For example, crystallization of C60 from benzene solution yields triclinic crystals with the formula C60·4C6H6. Like other solvates, this one readily releases benzene to give the usual fcc C60. Millimeter-sized crystals of C60 and  can be grown from solution both for solvates and for pure fullerenes.

Solid

In solid buckminsterfullerene, the C60 molecules adopt the fcc (face-centered cubic) motif. They start rotating at about −20 °C. This change is associated with a first-order phase transition to an fcc structure and a small, yet abrupt increase in the lattice constant from 1.411 to 1.4154 nm.

 solid is as soft as graphite, but when compressed to less than 70% of its volume it transforms into a superhard form of diamond (see aggregated diamond nanorod).  films and solution have strong non-linear optical properties; in particular, their optical absorption increases with light intensity (saturable absorption).

 forms a brownish solid with an optical absorption threshold at ≈1.6 eV. It is an n-type semiconductor with a low activation energy of 0.1–0.3 eV; this conductivity is attributed to intrinsic or oxygen-related defects. Fcc C60 contains voids at its octahedral and tetrahedral sites which are sufficiently large (0.6 and 0.2 nm respectively) to accommodate impurity atoms. When alkali metals are doped into these voids, C60 converts from a semiconductor into a conductor or even superconductor.

Chemical reactions and properties

Redox (electron-transfer reactions)
 undergoes six reversible, one-electron reductions, ultimately generating . It's oxidation is irreversible. The first reduction occurs at ≈-1.0 V (Fc/), showing that C60 is a reluctant electron acceptor.   tends to avoid having double bonds in the pentagonal rings, which makes electron delocalization poor, and results in  not being "superaromatic". C60 behaves like an electron deficient alkene. For example, it reacts with some nucleophiles.

Hydrogenation 
C60 exhibits a small degree of aromatic character, but it still reflects localized double and single C–C bond characters. Therefore, C60 can undergo addition with hydrogen to give polyhydrofullerenes. C60 also undergoes Birch reduction. For example, C60 reacts with lithium in liquid ammonia, followed by tert-butanol to give a mixture of polyhydrofullerenes such as C60H18, C60H32, C60H36, with C60H32 being the dominating product. This mixture of polyhydrofullerenes can be re-oxidized by 2,3-dichloro-5,6-dicyano-1,4-benzoquinone to give C60 again.

A selective hydrogenation method exists. Reaction of C60 with 9,9′,10,10′-dihydroanthracene under the same conditions, depending on the time of reaction, gives C60H32 and C60H18 respectively and selectively.

C60 can be hydrogenated, suggesting that a modified buckminsterfullerene called organometallic buckyballs (OBBs) could become a vehicle for "high density, room temperature, ambient pressure storage of hydrogen". These OBBs are created by binding atoms of a transition metal (TM) to C60 or C48B12 and then binding many hydrogen atoms to this TM atom, dispersing them evenly throughout the inside of the organometallic buckyball. The study found that the theoretical amount of H2 that can be retrieved from the OBB at ambient pressure approaches 9 wt %, a mass fraction that has been designated as optimal for hydrogen fuel by the U.S. Department of Energy.

Halogenation
Addition of fluorine, chlorine, and bromine occurs for C60. Fluorine atoms are small enough for a 1,2-addition, while Cl2 and Br2 add to remote C atoms due to steric factors. For example, in C60Br8 and C60Br24, the Br atoms are in 1,3- or 1,4-positions with respect to each other. Under various conditions a vast number of halogenated derivatives of C60 can be produced, some with an extraordinary selectivity on one or two isomers over the other possible ones. Addition of fluorine and chlorine usually results in a flattening of the C60 framework into a drum-shaped molecule.

Addition of oxygen atoms
Solutions of C60 can be oxygenated to the epoxide C60O. Ozonation of C60 in 1,2-xylene at 257K gives an intermediate ozonide C60O3, which can be decomposed into 2 forms of C60O. Decomposition of C60O3 at 296 K gives the epoxide, but photolysis gives a product in which the O atom bridges a 5,6-edge.

Cycloadditions
The Diels–Alder reaction is commonly employed to functionalize C60. Reaction of C60 with appropriate substituted diene gives the corresponding adduct.

The Diels–Alder reaction between C60 and 3,6-diaryl-1,2,4,5-tetrazines affords C62. The C62 has the structure in which a four-membered ring is surrounded by four six-membered rings.

The C60 molecules can also be coupled through a [2+2] cycloaddition, giving the dumbbell-shaped compound C120. The coupling is achieved by high-speed vibrating milling of C60 with a catalytic amount of KCN. Under high pressure and temperature, repeated [2+2] cycloaddition between C60 results in polymerized fullerene chains and networks. These polymers remain stable at ambient pressure and temperature once formed, and have remarkably interesting electronic and magnetic properties, such as being ferromagnetic above room temperature.

Free radical reactions
Reactions of C60 with free radicals readily occur. When C60 is mixed with a disulfide RSSR, the radical C60SR• forms spontaneously upon irradiation of the mixture.

Stability of the radical species C60Y• depends largely on steric factors of Y. When tert-butyl halide is photolyzed and allowed to react with C60, a reversible inter-cage C–C bond is formed:

Cyclopropanation (Bingel reaction)
Cyclopropanation (the Bingel reaction) is another common method for functionalizing C60. Cyclopropanation of C60 mostly occurs at the junction of 2 hexagons due to steric factors.

The first cyclopropanation was carried out by treating the β-bromomalonate with C60 in the presence of a base. Cyclopropanation also occur readily with diazomethanes. For example, diphenyldiazomethane reacts readily with C60 to give the compound C61Ph2.  Phenyl-C61-butyric acid methyl ester derivative prepared through cyclopropanation has been studied for use in organic solar cells.

Redox reactions – C60 anions and cations

C60 anions

The LUMO in C60 is triply degenerate, with the HOMO–LUMO separation relatively small. This small gap suggests that reduction of C60 should occur at mild potentials leading to fulleride anions, [C60]n− (n = 1–6). The midpoint potentials of 1-electron reduction of buckminsterfullerene and its anions is given in the table below:

C60 forms a variety of charge-transfer complexes, for example with tetrakis(dimethylamino)ethylene:
C60 + C2(NMe2)4 → [C2(NMe2)4]+[C60]−
This salt exhibits ferromagnetism at 16 K.

C60 cations
C60 oxidizes with difficulty. Three reversible oxidation processes have been observed by using cyclic voltammetry with ultra-dry methylene chloride and a supporting electrolyte with extremely high oxidation resistance and low nucleophilicity, such as [nBu4N] [AsF6].

Metal complexes

C60 forms complexes akin to the more common alkenes. Complexes have been reported  molybdenum, tungsten, platinum, palladium, iridium, and titanium.  The pentacarbonyl species are produced by photochemical reactions.

 M(CO)6 + C60 → M(η2-C60)(CO)5 + CO (M = Mo, W)

In the case of platinum complex, the labile ethylene ligand is the leaving group in a thermal reaction:
 Pt(η2-C2H4)(PPh3)2 + C60 → Pt(η2-C60)(PPh3)2 + C2H4

Titanocene complexes have also been reported:
 (η5-Cp)2Ti(η2-(CH3)3SiC≡CSi(CH3)3) + C60 → (η5-Cp)2Ti(η2-C60) + (CH3)3SiC≡CSi(CH3)3

Coordinatively unsaturated precursors, such as Vaska's complex, for adducts with C60:

 trans-Ir(CO)Cl(PPh3)2 + C60 → Ir(CO)Cl(η2-C60)(PPh3)2

One such iridium complex, [Ir(η2-C60)(CO)Cl(Ph2CH2C6H4OCH2Ph)2] has been prepared where the metal center projects two electron-rich 'arms' that embrace the C60 guest.

Endohedral fullerenes

Metal atoms or certain small molecules such as H2 and noble gas can be encapsulated inside the C60 cage. These endohedral fullerenes are usually synthesized by doping in the metal atoms in an arc reactor or by laser evaporation. These methods gives low yields of endohedral fullerenes, and a better method involves the opening of the cage, packing in the atoms or molecules, and closing the opening using certain organic reactions. This method, however, is still immature and only a few species have been synthesized this way.

Endohedral fullerenes show distinct and intriguing chemical properties that can be completely different from the encapsulated atom or molecule, as well as the fullerene itself. The encapsulated atoms have been shown to perform circular motions inside the C60 cage, and their motion has been followed using NMR spectroscopy.

Potential applications in technology
The optical absorption properties of C60 match the solar spectrum in a way that suggests that C60-based films could be useful for photovoltaic applications. Because of its high electronic affinity it is one of the most common electron acceptors used in donor/acceptor based solar cells. Conversion efficiencies up to 5.7% have been reported in C60–polymer cells.

Potential applications in health

Ingestion and risks 
C60 is sensitive to light, so leaving C60 under light exposure causes it to degrade, becoming dangerous. The ingestion of C60 solutions that have been exposed to light could lead to developing cancer (tumors). So the management of C60 products for human ingestion requires caution measures such as: elaboration in very dark environments, encasing into bottles of great opacity, and storing in dark places, and others like consumption under low light conditions and using labels to warn about the problems with light.

Solutions of C60 dissolved in olive oil or water, as long as they are preserved from light, have been found nontoxic to rodents.

Otherwise, a study found that C60 remains in the body for a longer time than usual, especially in the liver, where it tends to be accumulated, and therefore has the potential to induce detrimental health effects.

Oils with C60 and risks 
An experiment in 2011–2012 administered a solution of C60 in olive oil to rats, achieving a major prolongation of their lifespan. Since then, many oils with C60 have been sold as antioxidant products, but it does not avoid the problem of their sensitivity to light, that can turn them toxic. A later research confirmed that exposure to light degrades solutions of C60 in oil, making it toxic and leading to a "massive" increase of the risk of developing cancer (tumors) after its consumption.

To avoid the degradation by effect of light, C60 oils must be made in very dark environments, encased into bottles of great opacity, and kept in darkness, consumed under low light conditions and accompanied by labels to warn about the dangers of light for C60.

Some producers have been able to dissolve C60 in water to avoid possible problems with oils, but that would not protect C60 from light, so the same cautions are needed.

References

Bibliography

Further reading
 – describing the original discovery of C60
 – report describing the synthesis of C60 with combustion research published in 2000 at the 28th International Symposium on Combustion

External links

History of C60's discovery carried out by the Chemistry Department at Bristol University
A brief overview of buckminsterfullerene described by the University of Wisconsin-Madison
A report by Ming Kai College detailing the properties of buckminsterfullerene
Donald R. Huffman and Wolfgang Krätschmer's paper pertaining to the synthesis of C60 in Nature published in 1990
A thorough description of C60 by the Oak Ridge National Laboratory
An article about buckminsterfullerene on Connexions Science Encyclopaedia
Extensive statistical data compiled by the University of Sussex on the numerical quantitative properties of buckminsterfullerene
A web portal dedicated to buckminsterfullerene, authored and supported by the University of Bristol
Another web portal dedicated to buckminsterfullerene, authored and supported by the Chemistry Department at the University of Bristol
A brief article entirely devoted to C60 and its discovery, structure, production, properties, and applications
American Chemical Society's complete article on buckminsterfullerene
Buckminsterfullerene at The Periodic Table of Videos (University of Nottingham)

Fullerenes